Justice Swift may refer to:

Heman Swift, associate justice of the Connecticut Supreme Court of Errors
Jonathan Swift (judge), a justice of the British High Court of Justice
Zephaniah Swift, chief justice of the Connecticut Supreme Court of Errors

See also
Swift Justice, detective series
Swift Justice with Jackie Glass, syndicated court show